Captain John McDonell of Aberchalder (also spelled MacDonell; c. 1758-21 November 1809) was a soldier, judge, and political figure in Upper Canada following the American Revolution. He was elected as the first speaker for the Legislative Assembly of Upper Canada.

Early years
John McDonell of Aberchalder was born at Aberchalder Lodge in Scotland, a son of Alexander MacDonell of Aberchalder. In 1773, he came to the Mohawk Valley of New York with his father and uncles.

In 1775, during the American Revolution, McDonell was commissioned in the Royal Highland Emigrants. On 1 August 1778, he transferred to John Butler's Rangers. For a time, he served as paymaster at Fort Niagara.

Postwar life in Canada

When the Treaty of Paris ended the American Revolution in 1783, McDonell settled with other Highlander Loyalists along the St. Lawrence River in Upper Canada. He was appointed to the land board for the Lunenburgh District in 1788 and later for Glengarry & Stormont in 1792. He was appointed to the Court of Common Pleas and the district Court of Quarter Sessions. He was also named lieutenant for Glengarry County in 1792. He played an important role in the local militia, commanding the Upper Canada Battalion of the Royal Canadian Volunteer Regiment.

In 1792, McDonell and his brother Sir Hugh MacDonell of Aberchalder were elected to the Legislative Assembly representing Glengarry. John was chosen speaker. He was reelected in 1796, but was unable to attend until 1798 due to illness.

John McDonell of Aberchalder died of what was described as a "severe cold" at Quebec City in 1809. He was 51 years old and was serving at the time with the 10th Royal Veteran Battalion.

External links 
Biography at the Dictionary of Canadian Biography Online

John McDonell
1750s births
1809 deaths
Members of the Legislative Assembly of Upper Canada
People from the United Counties of Stormont, Dundas and Glengarry
Military personnel from Inverness
Scottish emigrants to Canada
Loyalists in the American Revolution from New York (state)
British Army personnel of the American Revolutionary War
Infectious disease deaths in Quebec
Speakers of the Legislative Assembly of Upper Canada
Loyalist military personnel of the American Revolutionary War
Upper Canada judges
Canadian slave owners